The Grammy Award for Best Arrangement was awarded from 1959 to 1962.

Since 1963 the award has been divided into two awards for Best Arrangement, Instrumental and Vocals & Best Arrangement, Instrumental or A Cappella.  In 1976 a vocal arrangement award was also added, now called the Grammy Award for Best Vocal Arrangement for Two or More Voices  

Years reflect the year in which the Grammy Awards were presented, for works released in the previous year.

Arrangement
Awards established in 1959
Awards disestablished in 1962